Those Usual Suspects  are an Australian electronic dance music band.  The group is a duo (formerly trio with Maarcos) - composed of Atridge (Atridge D'Costa) and Wei-Shen (Wei-Shen Mak).

The group were the first Australian artists to be signed on as one of Bob Sinclar's Africanism All Stars in 2007 and have releases several singles since then - most notably their collaboration with Dirty South called "Walking Alone".

Discography

Original

Remixes

External links
Official Site
Facebook
Soundcloud

References 

Musical groups from Melbourne